The Frenchman River,, also known locally as the Whitemud River, is a river in Saskatchewan, Canada and Montana, United States. It is a tributary of the Milk River, itself a tributary of the Missouri and in turn a part of the Mississippi River watershed that flows to the Gulf of Mexico.

The name origin is uncertain, although both Métis and francophone settlers inhabited its banks at the turn of the 20th century. The Frenchman Formation, a stratigraphical unit of the Western Canadian Sedimentary Basin, was named for the river.

Course 
It flows east towards the community of Eastend, then turns south-east. Various reservoirs are built on its course (Eastend Reservoir, Huff Lake, and Newton Lake) and the river is used extensively for irrigation. The river becomes meandered as it flows through the Grasslands National Park. Several creeks, such as Breed Creek, Little Breed Creek, and Otter Creek, flow into the Frenchman River from the Wood Mountain Hills. After the national park and the hills, the river turns south into Montana, where it flows into the Milk River, in Phillips County, Montana, north of Saco.

Fish species 
Fish species found in the Frenchman River include walleye, yellow perch, northern pike, burbot, common carp, white sucker, and shorthead redhorse.

See also 

List of rivers of Montana
List of rivers of Saskatchewan
List of tributaries of the Missouri River

References 

Rivers of Saskatchewan
Rivers of Montana
Rivers of Phillips County, Montana
Tributaries of the Missouri River
International rivers of North America